August Wikström (25 November 1874 – 16 August 1954) was a Swedish sports shooter. He competed in the 300m free rifle, three positions event at the 1912 Summer Olympics.

References

External links
 

1874 births
1954 deaths
Swedish male sport shooters
Olympic shooters of Sweden
Shooters at the 1912 Summer Olympics
People from Luleå
Sportspeople from Norrbotten County
20th-century Swedish people